Blatjang is a South African chutney made of dried fruit (usually apricots) and chillies cooked in vinegar and a staple in most white South African households, served as a condiment with South African meat dishes like bobotie and braai.

Overview 
Blatjang is a South African chutney made of dried fruit (usually apricots) and chillies cooked in vinegar and a staple in most South African households, served as a condiment with South African meat dishes like bobotie and braai.

Blatjang has Cape Malay origins with Indonesian, Malay, Indian and Dutch influences, reflecting South Africa's diverse culture. Blatjang is an Afrikaans word that can be drawn from “belacan” in Malay or “blachang” in Indonesian, which is an unrelated condiment to chutney.

The taste of blatjang, unlike most chutneys, can be tangy, sweet and fruity like Mrs Balls Fruit Chutney by Tiger Consumer Brands Limited, has a smoother texture and is traditionally made with dried apricots (or peaches or mango), raisins or dates, onion, garlic, cayenne pepper, brown sugar, salt, ginger, fresh mustard, vinegar and red chili.

Recipe 
Over the years, blatjang, like many South African foods have been chopped, changed and experimented with to fit personal preferences and lifestyles.

The following recipe is more of the traditional way of making blatjang.

Method

Step 1: Soak apricots and raisins in vinegar overnight until the fruits are plump.

Step 2: chop ingredients into small pieces.

Step 3: Add all ingredients to a saucepan and cook uncovered over medium heat, stirring occasionally, until the chutney has reduced to about one-third, and is at the right texture.

Step 3: Pour into hot, sterilized jars, seal and store in a cool, dark cupboard.

Also See 

 
  eaten similarly to dry chutney

References 

South African cuisine
Condiments